Larentia may refer to:

 Acca Larentia, Hercules' mistress or the adoptive mother of Romulus and Remus in Roman mythology
 Larentia (moth), a geometer moth genus
 Larentia (plant), a plant genus in the iris family

Genus disambiguation pages